Mátraszele is a village in Nógrád County, Hungary with 968 inhabitants (2014).

Populated places in Nógrád County